Felipe Romito (1893-1962) was an Argentine singer who sung in a bass-baritone voice. He appeared in the 1941 film White Eagle, his only screen performance.

References

Bibliography 
 Hurtado, María Elena.  Acario: el músico mágico. RIL Editores, 2009.

External links 
 

1893 births
1962 deaths
20th-century Argentine male singers
Singers from Rosario, Santa Fe